Living on Velvet is a 1935 American romantic drama film directed by Frank Borzage and starring Kay Francis, Warren William and George Brent.

Plot
One day, Terry Parker, an airplane pilot, is in a plane crash that kills his family.  He feels guilty for their death and feels like he should have died in the crash as well. Terry continues to get into trouble until his friend, Walter Pritcham, known as Gibraltar for his steady nature, brings him to a party. Terry meets the beautiful Amy Prentiss and they both fall in love.

Terry realizes that Amy is Gibraltar's girl and tries to leave Amy, but Gibraltar reunites the couple wanting Amy to be happy. Amy and Terry get married and Gibraltar gives them a house in the country on Long Island.  Terry is unemployed for some time until he gets the idea to fly commuters into New York.

However, Amy believes that Terry will not act responsibly and leaves him. Gibraltar tries to get Amy to go back to Terry, but she refuses.  Terry is in a car crash and Amy and Gibraltar rush to see him. Terry and Amy realize that they do love each other and vow never to leave each other ever again.

Cast
 Kay Francis as Amy Prentiss Parker
 Warren William as Walter 'Gibraltar' Pritcham
 George Brent as Terrence Clarence 'Terry' Parker
 Helen Lowell as Aunt Martha Prentiss
 Henry O'Neill as Harold Thornton
 Russell Hicks as Major at Flying Field
 Maude Turner Gordon as Mrs. Parker
 Samuel S. Hinds as Henry L. Parker
 Martha Merrill as Cynthia Parker
 Edgar Kennedy as Counterman

Reception
The New York Times review by Frank S. Nugent on March 8, 1935, praised the opening of the film, but said the conclusion was confusing: "With all the advantage of a rather neat plot situation, some brittle dialogue and the presence of the amiable George Brent and the attractive Kay Francis, Living on Velvet dwindles off to an unconvincing and rather meaningless ending, which does its best, in one stroke, to destroy most of the interest which the picture had succeeded in arousing during the earlier scenes. ... It is not the fault of the cast that the picture does not merit unqualified praise."

References

External links
 
 
 
 

1935 films
American romantic drama films
1935 romantic drama films
American black-and-white films
Warner Bros. films
Films directed by Frank Borzage
Films produced by Frank Borzage
American aviation films
1930s English-language films
1930s American films